Dragons: Fire & Ice is a 2004 computer-animated fantasy adventure film and the first of a two-part series based on the Mega Bloks toyline. The film was released directly to DVD in 2004, but also aired on Jetix in September 2005.

The story concerns two unlikely heroes, Prince Dev of the Norvagen and Princess Kyra of the Draigar. These two band together along with their dragons, Targon and Aurora, to help save Dragon World and their world from evil. A sequel, Dragons II: The Metal Ages, was released in 2005.

Plot
The movie starts with the history of how mighty fire-breathing dragons came to be. The dragons and their crystals of tremendous power came to the human world through a portal from their world of the dragons. But while the dragons brought knowledge and wanted only peace, the human kingdoms of Norvagen and Draigar wanted war and, having misused the knowledge brought by the dragons, battled erupted. Thoron, the Dragon King and holder of the legendary Aurathon crystal, appointed Xenoz the wizard as an ambassador for both the dragons and the two kingdoms with gifts of immortality and power and strength over all of the dragon crystals. However, when things started looking good, an evil force came upon the land and killed the Dragon Queen and took her ice crystal. After this, The Dragon King and many followers returned to their world, vowing to return only after the war had ended.

In the present day, King Olsef of the Norvagen Kingdom is giving his eight-year-old son, Prince Dev, some practice for battle while expressing his hatred for the Draigar, who he believes hunted the remaining dragons to near-extinction. While Dev's practice shows him to be too impulsive, Olsef believes nevertheless that he is ready to begin riding on Targon, the only dragon that they have left. During this time, Xenoz arrives and gives Dev his blessing. Meanwhile, in the Draigar kingdom, King Siddari is training Princess Kyra in the same form and blames the Norvagen for the disappearances of the dragons. Xenoz comes by to give the same blessing he gave to Dev so that Kyra can begin flying on the Draigar's last dragon, Aurora. During the flight, the dragons are drawn to a fireball in the sky where a portal opens and a black dragon on fire falls through, knocking the dragons and royals into an old battle field. The black dragon absorbs a bright green crystal on its neck and marks both the children with his mystical teardrops, disappearing into the ground soon after. As Dev and Kyra prepare to fight, their fathers appear and duel. While Dev and Kyra are taken away by their dragons, Xenoz watches through his scrying crystal, stating that the battle begins again.

Eight years later, Dev and Kyra are both sixteen-year-old teenagers with strange abilities and want the war to end, but their fathers object to their ideas on how it should. They both violate orders and continue with their ideas anyway, catching the eye of Xenoz in the process. The two royals fight until their fathers and armies show up to fight to the death once and for all. Just before the battle commences, an army of vorgans show up and capture the kings. Xenoz arrives just in time to save Dev and Kyra and takes them to his ice mountain home. Once there, Xenoz recommends that they retrieve the Aurathon from a rogue dragon in order to rescue their fathers. In the cave where the dragon resides, they fight him but are quickly overpowered. The dragon then reveals that they were sent there to try and trick him into giving the Aurathon's location so that Xenoz could take it for himself. They escape the following vorgan attack and go to the Ring of Oroborus. There, the Dragon reveals himself to be the Dragon King Thoron. The kings, meanwhile, have discovered Xenoz's treachery when they learn that he kept the bones of dragons  he had slain. Thoron explains the truth behind everything that made him leave. When Xenoz was granted the ability to use dragon crystals, it was only to promote good things between the two worlds. However, Xenoz conspired to kill the Dragon Queen with the help of an evil and vengeful dragon named Stendahl and take her ice crystal. When Thoron arrived, he flamed them in his fury, but it wasn't strong enough. He took Stendahl back to the dragon and imprisoned him. Stendahl broke free 1,000 years later and attacked Thoron again. During the battle, the Aurathon became activated. While Stendahl was stopped, he hurled Thoron through where he bumped into the royals eight years earlier. Knowing he didn't have any strength to fight Xenoz (who was still alive thanks to his gift of immortality), he absorbed the Aurathon into himself and placed it inside Dev and Kyra. Knowing now where their elemental abilities came from, Dev and Kyra begin practicing their powers over fire and air, but they tear a hole in the Ring of Oroborus, alerting Xenoz to their position. They escape the attack with Targon and Aurora's help and head for Xenoz's castle.

Back at the castle, Xenoz summons ice dragons to fight Thoron. Dev and Kyra break in and quickly dispatch the vorgan guards but are captured by Xenoz, who uses a mind-reading crystal to discover the Aurathon's hiding place within Dev and Kyra. He then proceeds to extract it from their bodies. Thoron crashes through and falls to the base of the castle, where he discovers the skeleton of his queen. With a new driving force, he heads off to fight Xenoz. After betraying Gortaz, the leader of the vorgans, Xenoz gets hit in the face by Kyra. A mask falls off to reveal that Xenoz's face is burned. The downside of Xenoz's immortality was that he could never heal himself and he wants revenge for this. He opens the portal to Dragon World but Thoron gets in the way, but Xenoz traps him in ice then explains that Dev and Kyra are weak and cannot do anything. Thoron begs to differ, pointing out that Dev and Kyra were chosen by the dragons themselves. With this, Dev and Kyra use their elemental abilities to break free and put the Aurathon back on Thoron's necklace. Thoron sticks himself in front of Xenoz's ice shards, seemingly sacrificing himself. However, he stands back up and then drags Xenoz back to Dragon World. With Xenoz gone, the ice castle begins to fall apart, so the kings and their children escape on Targon and Aurora.

The next day, both Norvagen and Draigar armies celebrate at Olsef's castle. During the celebration, the dragons return. Dev and Kyra jump on to Targon and Aurora to join the flight. As the celebration continues, Xenoz vows from his prison in Dragon World, which seems to be inside the Aurathon itself, "This is not over!"

Human characters

Prince Dev
Prince Dev (Mark Hildreth) is among the greatest of Norvagen warriors, though he suffers from a troubled temperament. At sixteen, he is the only son of the Norvagen King Olsef. When Dev was born, his people had already been at war for one thousand years with their bitter enemies, the Draigar. As the years passed Dev matured into one of the foremost Norvagen warriors, and remains a warrior at heart even now that peace has been established. Dev is a brazen risk-taker and has an unusual mental connection with the air and wind. It seems to reflect his moods, howling along the Norvagen battlements when Dev himself is angry. As Dev matured, his areokinetic abilities grew much stronger and more formidable. But this is cause for unease, because Dev does not have full control of these air/wind-based abilities, and nor does he have full control over his own turbulent moods and emotions. Dev's temperament is like his paternal great-grandfather, who was a berserker whose battle-fury carried him to victory after victory, until in the end it eventually destroyed him. Deep down, Dev himself is increasingly worried about his moods, and fears what destiny may lie in wait if he is not able to subdue them.

Princess Kyra
Kyra (Chiara Zanni) is a close and good friend to Dev, she too was born into nobility during the one thousand-year war between the Draigar and Norvagen. Unlike Dev, this young Draigar princess is thoughtful and meticulous, and rarely given over to impulsive actions. This tendency to over-think and over-analyze means that Kyra sometimes lacks spontaneity. She is fearless, brave, courageous, and formidable in battle. With her martial arts prowess, she's as graceful as a dancer and as swift as a striking, deadly snake. She is also quite skilled and proficient in using an extremely long white-and-pink bo staff weapon in conjunction with her hand-to-hand combat and martial art skills, making her more of a match for multiple adversaries. Her exceptional knowledge and skills in both bojutsu and jojutsu and are quite extensive. Kyra also has a deadly dry wit, and a tongue that's as quick as her spearhead weapon. She possesses a magical ability – and a destiny – she does yet fully understand. She has a mystical connection with fire, flame, and heat, which will flare up and recede in accordance with her moods just like Dev's incredibly strong areokinetic abilities. Increasingly troubled by Dev's turbulent moods, Kyra has tried to talk to him about her concerns, but this just causes him to withdraw from her. Kyra still regards Dev as her closest and dearest friend, but these days she feels painfully distanced from him, and more and more she fears where his inner anger will lead him.

Xenoz
Xenoz (Mark Oliver) is an evil Wizard who cryokinetically creates, controls, molds, and manipulates solid ice to his every whim and desire. He is a tremendously strong and powerful, and along with Stendhal, assassinated the Dragon Queen and many more dragons and stole their power - crystals to tremendously magnify and increase his own magical strength and abilities a hundredfold. With his scrying crystal, he can telepathically see into people's minds. He longs to own the Aurothon, the almighty powerful crystal belonging to King Thoron himself. He also wears an ice mask which looks like his original face. His real face is hideously scared, burned and deformed from the retaliating attack from Thoron after his dearly beloved queen's murder and he resents Thoron even more for this fact.

Gortaz
Gortaz (Brian Dobson) is a Vorgan. The Vorgons are a race of half human/half beast creatures. Gortaz is the leader of the Vorgan army and killed many dragons with Xenoz for food. The Vorgans themselves have been able to tame a primitive race of dragons from the swamps known as Nogards. Gortaz is eventually betrayed by Xenoz and falls to his death.

Dragons

Thoron
Thoron (Richard Newman) is the King of Dragons. He wears a huge silver collar around his neck but it has no gemstone. This is because he split the bright green-colored Aurothon, his gemstone, in two shards and hid the shards inside Dev and Kyra which gave them their elemental abilities over air and fire. Thoron can pass between both the Human and Dragon World and activate magical locations no others can. His beloved queen, whose name is unknown, was assassinated by Stendhal, a rogue dragon that was once good friends with Thoron. He can breathe incredibly strong and powerful fire. His gemstone is the Aurathon, and he is the only one besides Qionous who can use it.

Stendhal
Stendhal (Scott McNeil) is a red dragon who was banished from Dragon World for committing treason. He was once friends with Thoron and often competed with each other, but when Thoron was crowned king of the dragons, Stendhal grew jealous and rebelled against him. He teamed up with Xenoz to kill the Dragon Queen so that Xenoz could take her Ice Crystal. As punishment Stendehl was imprisoned for 1000 years. After he was released, he immediately battled Thoron once again. During this battle, the Aurothon was activated and though Stendhal was defeated and imprisoned in a golden temple, Thoron was hurled into the human world. He was almost freed by a sorceress named Scylla, the leader of the Odaku, in return for teaching her how to conjure Shadow Dragons.

Shadow Dragons
These dragons are the spirits of evil dragons, made of shadow. They have high pitched whispery voices and can scare humans into death. They are normally never seen but fly around sometimes when summoned. Stendhal had knowledge in how to summon these evil beings and taught the methods to Scylla in exchange for his freedom. It is said when Shadow Dragons kill pure-hearted dragons, their victims are reborn as Light Dragons, the polar opposites of Shadow Dragons. Light Dragons are said to be the only creatures powerful enough to kill Shadow Dragons. After Slann was killed in Metal Ages, he too became a Shadow Dragon and managed to sneak into Dragon World. Slann was described as weighing 20 tons and even his legs breathed fire. This was later revealed to be due to the JATO bottles he strapped there, which he used for both flight and weaponry.

Ice Dragons
These dragons are made of dragon bones and ice, and were summoned by Xenoz. They screech a lot and breath sharp shards of ice breath. They can be melted by fire and have long curving horns like a bull.

References

External links
 MegaBloks - Dragons: Fire & Ice
 

2004 films
2004 computer-animated films
2000s American animated films
2000s children's animated films
Lionsgate films
Films based on toys
Films about dragons
Lionsgate animated films
American children's fantasy films
Canadian children's fantasy films
Animated films about dragons
2000s children's fantasy films
2000s English-language films
2000s Canadian films